Bosconero  is a comune (municipality) in the Metropolitan City of Turin in the Italian region Piedmont, located about  north of Turin.

Bosconero borders the following municipalities: Rivarolo Canavese, San Giusto Canavese, Feletto, Foglizzo, San Benigno Canavese, and Lombardore.

References

Cities and towns in Piedmont
Canavese